The University of Wisconsin Colleges, established in 1971 was a unit of the University of Wisconsin System composed of 13 local two-year campuses and one online campus, University of Wisconsin Colleges Online. These campuses offered a liberal arts, transfer-parallel curriculum. The Colleges as a functional unit was dissolved as of June 30, 2018. The physical campuses are now affiliated with some of the four-year campuses of the University of Wisconsin System.

Campuses
The campuses are:

University of Wisconsin Colleges Online

University of Wisconsin–Eau Claire:
University of Wisconsin-Eau Claire – Barron County
University of Wisconsin–Green Bay:
University of Wisconsin-Green Bay, Manitowoc Campus
University of Wisconsin-Green Bay, Marinette Campus
University of Wisconsin-Green Bay, Sheboygan Campus
University of Wisconsin–Platteville:
University of Wisconsin-Platteville Baraboo Sauk County
University of Wisconsin-Platteville Richland
University of Wisconsin–Milwaukee:
University of Wisconsin–Milwaukee at Washington County
University of Wisconsin–Milwaukee at Waukesha
University of Wisconsin–Oshkosh:
University of Wisconsin–Fond du Lac
University of Wisconsin–Fox Valley
University of Wisconsin–Stevens Point:
University of Wisconsin–Stevens Point at Wausau
University of Wisconsin–Stevens Point at Marshfield
University of Wisconsin–Whitewater:
University of Wisconsin–Whitewater at Rock County

An Associate degree can be earned at any of the campuses, including the online campus. Six of the campuses now (2013) offer a Bachelor of Applied Arts and Sciences degree. The UW Colleges is also frequently used as a stepping stone in order to transfer to another institution in the University of Wisconsin System. This is facilitated by the "Guaranteed Transfer Program" whereby a student is guaranteed admission as a junior to another institution if certain requirements are met.

History
In 1940, the University of Wisconsin-Extension began operating freshman-sophomore centers across the state. After World War II, the UW Board of Regents encouraged counties and municipalities to donate land for this purpose, mainly to serve the influx of students enrolling after the war. After the 1971 merger of the University of Wisconsin System with the Wisconsin State Universities System to form the present-day UW System, the freshman-sophomore centers became a separate institution of the newly created system known as the University of Wisconsin Centers. The centers became known as University of Wisconsin Colleges in 1997.

In 2005, the Board of Regents partially reunited UW Colleges with UW-Extension. Although the two units share a single administration, they have separate provosts and retain separate identities.

The last chancellor of both UW Colleges and UW-Extension was Cathy Sandeen.

Restructuring 
Due to years of declining enrollment, to shore up the two year campuses, the University of Wisconsin System on November 9, 2017, the UW Board of Regents voted to proceed with a proposal that  merged the physical University of Wisconsin Colleges campuses with seven of the four-year campuses of the University of Wisconsin System. The merger created regional clusters with two-year branches of the comprehensive four-year campuses. It would allow the system to maintain a higher education presence throughout the state's counties where college-aged students had dropped because of declining birthrates. The resulting merger would also allow students to freely transfer from a two-year campus to any for year-year institution within the university system.

See also
Wisconsin Technical College System

References

External links
University of Wisconsin Colleges

Further reading 
Bower, Jerry. The University of Wisconsin Colleges, 1919-1997: The Wisconsin Idea at Work. New Past P, 2002. 978-0938627555

University of Wisconsin System